Kiyaras Rural District is a rural district (dehestan) in the Central District of Gotvand County, Khuzestan Province, Iran. At the 2006 census, its population was 2,749, in 457 families.  The rural district has 20 villages.

References 

Rural Districts of Khuzestan Province
Gotvand County